John Joseph McNamee (September 24, 1926 – July 16, 2011) was an American professional basketball player.

A 6'6" forward/center from the University of San Francisco, McNamee played two seasons (1950–1952) in the National Basketball Association as a member of the Rochester Royals and Baltimore Bullets. He averaged 2.4 points per game in his career and won a league championship with Rochester in 1951. Joe went on to have a long and successful career in sales for Watson and Meehan, a distributor of Cummins engines. Joe and his wife Alice had 8 kids (Sharon, John, Pattie, Casey, Dennis, Peter, Steve and Jim) and 11 grandchildren.

References

1926 births
2011 deaths
American men's basketball players
Baltimore Bullets (1944–1954) players
Basketball players from San Francisco
Centers (basketball)
Power forwards (basketball)
Rochester Royals draft picks
Rochester Royals players
San Francisco Dons men's basketball players